Guangdong Guangya High School is a reputed senior high school in Guangzhou, Guangdong, People's Republic of China which was founded by Zhang Zhidong, Viceroy of Liangguang on  Its earliest predecessor Guangya Academy was one of the Four Academies of China in the late Qing dynasty. The name "Guangya" was chosen by Zhang Zhidong, meaning knowledgeability and integrity.

Programs and campuses
Guangya High School follows the standard Chinese secondary education system and offers a three-year senior  program. Students are recruited via municipal high school admission exams. It used to offer a three-year junior program, but the program was moved in 2005 to the privately funded Guangya Experimental School, which itself was established in 2002 and is located in the immediate vicinity. A second "Guangya Experimental"-branded privately funded campus was established in Baiyun District in 2011.

In addition to the campuses in Guangzhou, Guangya High School also operates privately funded campuses in some other cities in Guangdong. An operational campus is located in Yangdong County of Yangjiang and offers both primary and secondary education. A new campus in Boluo County of Huizhou is under construction  and scheduled for opening in September 2014.

School Name 
 21 October 1912 to August 1935: Guangdong Province First Middle School
 August 1935 to October 1938: Guangdong Province "Kwong Nga" High School
 October 1938 to February 1941: Guangdong Provincial South Road temporary secondary school
 February 1941 to 1968: Guangdong Province "Kwong Nga" High School
 1968: "Red Flag" High School.
 1968 to February 1979: "Guangzhou 54st High School"
 February 1979 to now: Guangdong "Guangya" High School.

History

Establishment

In a memorial to the imperial court, Zhang Zhidong stated his motivations for establishing Guangya Academy ( /). He wrote on the necessity of favoring scholarship and creating an educated social atmosphere in Liangguang. He also cited inadequate capacities of several existing academies for taking in students. He was granted permission to purchase  of land in northwest Guangzhou (known as Canton at that time) for the academy. The inaugural head of the academy was Liang Dingfen, a scholar whom Zhang Zhidong frequently consulted with education issues.

Evolution
In the over 120 years of its history, Guangya High School evolved with the development of the modern history of China. Until the collapse of Qing Dynasty, Guangya Academy and its successors remained a traditional Chinese academy where Zhang Zhidong's doctrine of "Chinese learning for fundamental principles, Western learning for practical application" was practiced. In 1912, under the rule of the newly founded Republic of China, the academy, which had stopped admitting students from Guangxi and become known as Guangdong Advanced Academy, was reorganized as Guangdong Provincial No. 1 High School and was the first high school ever established in Guangdong. The school adopted the western system of three-year junior and senior secondary education in 1922 and opened a senior department in 1924 when the first batch of junior students graduated under the new system. In 1928, educator Liang Shuming was appointed as the principal and proposed the motto "Endeavor in the Fundamentals and Pursue the Truth". The name "Guangya" was restored as the school was renamed Guangdong Provincial Guangya High School in 1935, then dropped in 1939 as the school moved out of Guangzhou after the city fell to the Japanese forces during the Sino-Japanese War, and restored again in 1941.

The current name "Guangdong Guangya High School" was first used in 1949 under the rule of the People's Republic of China. During the Cultural Revolution, the school was renamed Guangdong Red Flag School and later Guangdong Red Flag High School, an evident reflection of the political zealotry of the era. It was redesignated as Guangzhou No. 54 High School in 1969. The last renaming occurred in 1978. The current name was restored and has remained in use since.

Gallery

Notes and references

Notes

References

High schools in Guangdong
Educational institutions established in 1888
1888 establishments in China